Łukasz Kaliński (1578–1634) was a Catholic prelate who served as Auxiliary Bishop of Lviv (1626–1634) and Titular Bishop of  Nicopolis in Epiro (1626–1634).

Biography
Łukasz Kaliński was born in 1578. On 22 Jun 1626, he was appointed during the papacy of Pope Urban VIII as Auxiliary Bishop of Lviv and Titular Bishop of Nicopolis in Epiro. He served as Auxiliary Bishop of Lviv until his death in 1634.

References

External links and additional sources
 (for Chronology of Bishops) 
 (for Chronology of Bishops)  
 (for Chronology of Bishops) 

17th-century Roman Catholic bishops in the Polish–Lithuanian Commonwealth
Bishops appointed by Pope Urban VIII
1578 births
1634 deaths